Thomas Wharton may refer to:

Thomas Wharton, 1st Baron Wharton (1495–1568), English nobleman
Thomas Wharton, 2nd Baron Wharton (1520–1572), English nobleman
Thomas Wharton (died 1622) (1588–1622), son of the 3rd Baron Wharton, father of the 4th Baron Wharton
Thomas Wharton (anatomist) (1614–1673), English anatomist
Thomas Wharton (died 1684) (c. 1615–1684), English politician, son of Thomas Wharton (died 1622)
Thomas Wharton, 1st Marquess of Wharton (1648–1715), English nobleman and politician, credited with being the lyricist of Lilliburlero
Thomas Wharton Jr. (1735–1778), American politician and 1st President of Pennsylvania
Thomas Wharton (children's writer), American artist
Thomas Wharton (author) (born 1963), Canadian novelist
Tiny Wharton (Tom Wharton, 1927–2005), Scottish soccer referee

See also
Thomas Warton the elder (c. 1688–1745), English clergyman, schoolmaster and poet
Thomas Warton (the younger) (1728–1790), English literary historian, critic, and Poet Laureate